Mohamed Salah Hamed Mahrous Ghaly (born 15 June 1992), also known as Mo Salah, is an Egyptian professional footballer who plays as a forward for  club Liverpool and captains the Egypt national team. Considered one of the best players in the world and amongst the greatest African players of all time, he is known for his finishing, dribbling, and speed.

Salah started his senior career in 2010 playing for Al Mokawloon, departing in 2012 to join Basel, where he won two Swiss Super League titles. In 2014, Salah joined Chelsea for a reported fee of £11 million, but limited gametime led to successive loans to Fiorentina and Roma, who later signed him permanently for €15 million. In the 2016–17 season, Salah was a key figure in Roma's unsuccessful title bid, reaching double figures in both goals and assists.

In 2017, Salah signed for Liverpool for a then-club record transfer of £36.9 million. In his first season, he set the record for most Premier League goals scored (32) in a 38-game season and helped Liverpool to the 2018 UEFA Champions League Final. Salah went on to be an integral player in the club's Champions League and Premier League title successes the following two seasons, and has since also won the FA Cup and the League Cup. Salah has achieved numerous individual accolades, including two PFA Players' Player of the Year awards, three Premier League Golden Boots, the Premier League Player of the Season, the Premier League Playmaker of the Season, and finished third for the Best FIFA Men's Player in 2018 and 2021. He received the 2018 FIFA Puskás Award for his winning strike in the first Merseyside derby of the 2017–18 season. In 2023, Salah became Liverpool's Premier League top goalscorer surpassing Robbie Fowler.  

At international level, Salah represented Egypt at youth level before making his senior debut in 2011. Following his performances at the 2012 Summer Olympics, he was named CAF Most Promising African Talent of the Year. Since then, he finished as runner-up in the 2017 and 2021 Africa Cup of Nations and was top scorer during CAF qualification as Egypt qualified for the 2018 FIFA World Cup. Salah was named CAF African Footballer of the Year (2017 and 2018), BBC African Footballer of the Year (2017 and 2018), and was selected in the 2017 Africa Cup of Nations Team of the Tournament, 2021 Africa Cup of Nations Team of the Tournament and the CAF Team of the Year on several occasions.

Club career

Al Mokawloon

2006–10: Youth teams
Salah started out playing for local youth teams. He names Ronaldo, Zinedine Zidane and Francesco Totti as his childhood idols. In 2006, he joined the youth team of Al Mokawloon aged 14 after being spotted by a scout who had originally come to watch another child play but was distracted by Salah. Salah frequently had to miss school to make the 3 hour journey to training. When Salah was 15 he was noticed by then first team manager Mohamed Radwan, who moved him to the senior squad immediately. Salah had to be given a special diet and training program due to his muscles not being fully formed because of his young age.

2010–12: Senior team appearances
Salah made his senior team debut in the Egyptian Premier League coming on as a substitute on 3 May 2010 in a 1–1 away draw against El Mansoura. During the 2010–11 season Salah continued earning minutes on the pitch, eventually becoming a regular in the team. Even though he was getting regular game time, Salah struggled to score. In the dressing room after matches he would sometimes be in tears because of this, and Radwan says it only motivated him to become better. He scored his first goal for them on 25 December 2010 in a 1–1 away draw against Al Ahly. He remained a regular for Al Mokawloon, appearing in every game of the 2011–12 season. Following the Port Said Stadium riot on 1 February 2012, the Egyptian Premier League was suspended, and on 10 March 2012, the Egyptian Football Association announced their decision to cancel the remainder of the season.

Basel

2012–13: Development and breakthrough 

Swiss Super League club Basel had been monitoring Salah for some time, so following the Egyptian Premier League suspension, the club organised a friendly match with the Egypt U-23 team. The match took place on 16 March at the Stadion Rankhof in Basel, and despite only playing the second half, Salah scored twice, helping the Egyptians to a 4–3 win. Basel subsequently invited Salah to remain in the city for a week's training. On 10 April 2012, it was announced that Salah had signed for Basel on a four-year contract starting from 15 June 2012. He initially found it difficult to settle, having arrived unable to speak the language and been signed as a replacement for fan-favourite Xherdan Shaqiri (whom he would later play alongside at Liverpool). Salah scored on his unofficial debut on 23 June 2012 against Steaua București during a friendly match, a 4–2 defeat. He made his official Basel debut in a UEFA Champions League preliminary stage match against the Norwegian club Molde on 8 August, coming on as a substitute in the 74th minute. He made his league debut on 12 August against Thun, playing the full match.

He scored his first league goal a week later, the second goal in the 2–0 home win against Lausanne. Salah scored his first Europa League goal in the quarter-finals on 11 April 2013, as Basel advanced to the semi-finals by beating Tottenham Hotspur 4–1 on penalties after a 4–4 aggregate draw. In the semi-final on 2 May, Salah scored against Chelsea at Stamford Bridge, although they were beaten 5–2 on aggregate. Despite late disappointment in Europe, Basel comfortably won the Swiss Super League season 2012–13 Championship title and finished runners-up in the Swiss Cup.

2013–14: Final season and league championship 
Ahead of the 2013–14 Swiss Super League season, Salah was a member of the Basel team that won the 2013 Uhrencup. Salah scored in his first league appearance of the season against Aarau on 13 July 2013. He scored his first Champions League goal a month later against Maccabi Tel Aviv on 6 August 2013 in the third qualifying round. Salah was the subject of major controversy following the game, after he appeared to deliberately avoid shaking hands with the players of the Israeli club in both the home and away legs.

He scored twice against the Bulgarian league champions PFC Ludogorets Razgrad on 21 August 2013 in the play-off round. On 18 September 2013, Salah scored the equaliser against Chelsea in the 2–1 away win during the group stage. During the return tie on 26 November at the St. Jakob-Park, Salah scored the winning goal as Basel beat Chelsea for the second time with a 1–0 home win. However he was unable to prevent Basel being eliminated in the group stage.

On the domestic stage, Salah continued to perform. Scoring 4 goals in 18 games, including a double against title rivals Young Boys, he helped Basel win the league title for the fifth time in a row.

On 23 January 2014 it was announced that Salah would leave Basel. During his time with the club, Salah played a total of 95 games for Basel scoring a total of 21 goals. 47 of these games were in the Swiss Super League, six in the Swiss Cup, 26 in the UEFA competitions (Champions League and Europa League) and 16 were friendly games. He scored nine goals in the domestic league, four in the cup, seven in the European games and the other was scored during the test games.

Chelsea

2013–14: Entry into first-team squad 
On 23 January 2014, Chelsea announced that a deal had been agreed with Basel to sign Salah for a fee reported to be in the region of £11 million. Three days later the transfer was completed, making him the first Egyptian to sign for the London-based club. Liverpool had been keen to sign the Basel striker, and had made an offer of £11 million but were beaten to his signature by the Blues.

On 8 February, Salah made his debut for Chelsea in the Premier League, coming on as a substitute in the 3–0 win over Newcastle United. Seven games later, on 22 March, Salah scored his first goal for Chelsea against Arsenal at Stamford Bridge in the London Derby, coming on as a substitute for Oscar, in a match which ended with a 6–0 win for the Blues. Then, on 5 April, Salah opened the scoring and later won a penalty and assisted the third goal in Chelsea's 3–0 win over Stoke City.

2014–15: Domestic success 

Before the 2014–15 season, Salah's future with Chelsea looked to be in doubt after reports suggested he could be forced to return to Egypt to carry out military service after his registration for an education scheme was rescinded by the Egyptian Minister of Higher Education. He was spared of military service after a meeting with the then Egyptian prime minister Ibrahim Mahlab, the Minister of Higher Education and the Egyptian national manager Shawky Gharieb. Salah changed squad numbers from 15 to 17 for the start of the season, with his new number having been vacated by Eden Hazard changing to number 10.

Salah was rarely used during the season, making just three Premier League, two UEFA Champions League and three cup appearances, failing to score in any of them. On 28 October 2014, after a poor performance in a 2–1 win at League Two club Shrewsbury Town in the fourth round of the League Cup, he and fellow winger André Schürrle were criticized publicly by manager José Mourinho. Although Salah only made three league appearances before his loan move to Fiorentina, Mourinho stated that he would receive a replica winner's medal from the club for his contributions that season.

2015: Loan to Fiorentina 
On the transfer deadline day, 2 February 2015, Chelsea confirmed that Salah would join Italian club Fiorentina on an 18-month loan until the end of the 2015–16 season, as part of a transfer deal which saw Juan Cuadrado moving in the opposite direction. Six days after signing, he made his Fiorentina debut coming off the bench in the 65th minute as a replacement for Joaquín in a 3–2 Serie A victory against Atalanta at the Stadio Artemio Franchi. Salah chose the number 74 shirt in honor of the victims of the Port Said Stadium riot.

Salah made his first start for Fiorentina on 14 February against Sassuolo, scoring his first goal for the club in the 30th minute. He then provided an assist to Khouma Babacar just two minutes after scoring; the match ended in a 3–1 win for Fiorentina. Twelve days later, Salah scored his first European goal for Fiorentina, as his side advanced to the round of 16 of the Europa League, beating Tottenham 3–1 on aggregate. Salah scored the winning goal for Fiorentina against Inter Milan on 1 March, his third goal in Serie A. Four days after that, Salah scored both of Fiorentina's goals in their 2–1 win away to Juventus in the Coppa Italia semi-final first leg. At the end of the season, Fiorentina activated an option to make the loan move permanent, but Salah refused the move. Even though the loan agreement was for 18 months, Salah refused to return to Fiorentina and instead joined fellow Serie A club Roma. On 11 September, Fiorentina filed a complaint to FIFA, claiming that Chelsea had breached the agreed contract when they allowed Salah to join Roma on loan. The Court of Arbitration for Sport cleared Salah and Chelsea of any wrongdoing.

2015–16: Loan to Roma 
On 6 August 2015, Salah joined Roma on a season-long loan for €5 million; with the option to make the deal permanent, for a reported €15 million. He wore the number 11 shirt. He made his debut on 22 August, as the new season began with a 1–1 draw at Hellas Verona. On 20 September, Salah scored his first goal of the season against Sassuolo to help Roma salvage a point as the match ended in a 2–2 draw. He went on to score in his following two matches, a 2–1 loss against Sampdoria and a 5–1 win against Carpi. On 25 October, Salah returned to the Stadio Artemio Franchi, scoring the opener against his former club Fiorentina to help earn a fourth straight league win for Roma. In his return, Salah was also sent off after picking up a second yellow in the closing minutes of the match, just seconds after picking up his first yellow. On 4 November, he scored the opening goal of a 3–2 Champions League win over Bayer Leverkusen.

On 4 March, he faced his former side Fiorentina again and scored another double as Roma won 4–1 and broke into the top three. Salah would go onto score another three goals that season, scoring against Bologna, Genoa, and AC Milan, the latter on the final day. In the 2015–16 season, Salah scored 15 goals in 42 matches as Roma finished in third place in Serie A and qualified for the Champions League. In June, it was announced that Salah won the club's 2015–16 Player of the Season award.

Roma

2016–17: Permanent transfer, Serie A runner-up 
On 3 August 2016, Roma announced the signing of Salah on a permanent deal for €15 million. He scored his first goal of the season in a 4–0 win over Udinese in the opening game of the season on 20 August.  On 6 November, Salah scored a hat-trick in a 3–0 win over Bologna, his first club career hat-trick. However, a ruptured ankle ligament kept him out for the first half of December. He returned as a half-time substitute in a 1–0 defeat against title rivals Juventus on 17 December. Salah then endured a two-month period without a goal, he broke his drought on 19 February, scoring against Torino in a 4–1 win. On 9 March, he scored Roma's opening goal in an eventual 4–2 defeat to Lyon in the first leg of the round of sixteen in the UEFA Europa League. In spite of a 2–1 win in the second leg, they were unable to turn the tie around and were knocked out 5–4 and aggregate.  On 28 May, in the final game of the season, Salah was substituted for captain Francesco Totti, who was playing his final game with the club, in a 3–2 win over Genoa. Roma finished the season in second, just four points behind champions Juventus. Salah scored 19 goals in all competitions.

Liverpool

2017–18: Record-breaking individual success 

On 22 June 2017, Salah agreed a transfer to Liverpool. He signed a long-term contract with the Reds for an initial £36.5m fee that could rise to £43m. The fee was a club record, eclipsing the £35m spent on Andy Carroll in 2011. He was assigned the number 11 shirt previously worn by Roberto Firmino who instead switched to number 9. He joined the club on 1 July upon the opening of the summer transfer window, becoming Liverpool's first Egyptian player. He scored on his Premier League debut against Watford in a 3–3 draw on 12 August. On 24 August, Salah scored his second goal for Liverpool, in a 2017–18 UEFA Champions League play-off round 4–2 win (6–3 agg) against Hoffenheim, his first goal at Anfield. Three days later, Salah scored and assisted a goal in a 4–0 victory over Arsenal. For his performances in August, Salah was awarded Player of the Month by Liverpool supporters. On 17 October, Salah netted twice in a 7–0 Champions League win over Maribor, helping Liverpool to the joint-largest ever away win in the competition, and the largest away win by an English club.

On 26 November, Salah scored the opener and refused to celebrate in a 1–1 home draw with his former team Chelsea out of respect for the club as well as victims of the North Sinai Mosque attack two days earlier. Salah rose the top of the Premier League goalscoring charts by scoring twice after coming on as a substitute away at Stoke City on 29 November in a 3–0 win. The following month, Salah netted in a 4–0 win over AFC Bournemouth; a result which saw Liverpool become the first team in Premier League history to win four consecutive away league matches by a margin of at least three goals. In the process, he also became the joint-second fastest player to reach 20 goals for Liverpool on his 26th appearance, behind George Allan who reached the milestone in 19 appearances in 1895.

On 17 March 2018, Salah scored four goals in a 5–0 win over Watford, which was his first hat-trick for Liverpool. In this game, he also broke a record of scoring 36 times in his debut season for Liverpool, and also became the leading goalscorer in Europe's top five leagues – overtaking Barcelona's Lionel Messi and Tottenham striker Harry Kane. Following Salah's record-breaking goal exploits former Liverpool captain Steven Gerrard stated "we are witnessing the start of greatness".

In early April 2018, he scored in both Champions League quarter-final matches against Manchester City to help his side advance. On 22 April 2018, Salah was awarded the PFA Players' Player of the Year award, having earlier been named in the PFA Team of the Year for the Premier League. Two days later, he scored a brace in a 5–2 Champions League semi-final first leg win over former club, Roma. In doing so, he simultaneously became the first player from Africa and the first Liverpool player to score 10 goals in a single campaign in the tournament. His double also took him to 43 goals for the season across all competitions, surpassing Roger Hunt's tally of 42, and making him Liverpool's second-highest goalscorer in a single season, behind Ian Rush. He had previously also broken the club's record for the Premier League era, surpassing Robbie Fowler's total of 36 goals set in the 1995–96 campaign, and Fernando Torres' record of 33 for the most goals by a Liverpool player in a debut season. After his two goals and assists in the first leg against Roma, Salah featured in the second leg as Liverpool beat Roma 7–6 on aggregate to qualify for the final for the first time in eleven years. He would then become the Premier League's all-time goalscorer for a 38-game season, registering his 32nd league goal in a 4–0 win against Brighton & Hove Albion en route to being awarded the Premier League Golden Boot.

In the 2018 UEFA Champions League Final against Real Madrid, Salah injured his left shoulder in the 30th minute after a challenge by Madrid defender Sergio Ramos. After initially carrying on, he left the field in tears after going to ground again; the match ended in a 3–1 defeat. The Egyptian FA stated that this would have no effect on his playing at the 2018 World Cup in Russia and that Salah would still be named in the team's final squad on 4 June. The day after the match, Ramos wrote a message and sent him good wishes.

2018–19: European champion and second Golden Boot 

On 2 July 2018, Salah signed a new long-term contract with Liverpool. Manager Jürgen Klopp said the news was important as a statement of intent in terms of Liverpool's status in the football world in having Salah commit himself further to the club. On 12 August, Salah scored Liverpool's first goal of the season, in a 4–0 win over West Ham United. On 20 August, in a 2–0 away win over Crystal Palace, Salah played a part in both of Liverpool's goals; winning a penalty for the first, and providing an assist for Sadio Mané for the second. Five days later, Salah scored the only goal in Liverpool's 1–0 win over Brighton.

On 30 August 2018, Salah was named on the three-man shortlist for the UEFA Men's Player of the Year, coming in third place, and was also included on the three-man shortlist for the UEFA Forward of the Season, coming in second place. On 3 September he was named on the three-man shortlist for the Best FIFA Men's Player, finishing third. Salah controversially received the 2018 FIFA Puskás Award for goal of the year, the winning strike his goal at Anfield in his first Merseyside derby, prompting online protests against the decision. On 24 October, Salah scored twice against Red Star Belgrade in the UEFA Champions League group stage, with his second goal his 50th for the club. With 50 goals in 65 games he is the fastest player in Liverpool history to reach the half century.

On 8 December, Salah scored a hat-trick in a 4–0 away win over Bournemouth, to move Liverpool to the top of the league table. Three days later, he scored the winning goal in a 1–0 win over Napoli in their final Champions League group fixture, the result qualifying Liverpool to the round of sixteen. On 19 January 2019, he scored his 50th Premier League goal with a brace in a 4–3 win over Crystal Palace, reaching the tally in 72 appearances. In doing so, he became the joint-fourth fastest player to achieve the milestone, alongside Fernando Torres, and behind only Andy Cole, Alan Shearer and Ruud van Nistelrooy.

In February 2019, West Ham said they were investigating a video which allegedly showed fans racially abusing Salah, including for being Muslim. The investigation resulted in the fan being banned for three years. On 5 April, he scored his 50th Premier League goal for Liverpool in a 3–1 win over Southampton and in the process broke Torres' record to become the fastest player to reach the milestone for the club, doing so in his 69th appearance. It also saw him become the third fastest player to reach the milestone for a single club in the Premier League era, behind Shearer for Blackburn Rovers, in 66 appearances, and Van Nistelrooy for Manchester United, in 68 appearances. Later that month, he scored the second goal, a powerful strike from 25 yards out that flew into the top corner, in a 2–0 win over Chelsea which helped Liverpool earn a club-record-equaling 26th win for the Premier League campaign; and the club's second-highest ever wins return in the top-flight after the record of 30 set in 1979. On 26 April, he made his 100th appearance for Liverpool and broke the record jointly held by Roger Hunt and Sam Raybould for the player with the most goals in his first century of appearances for the club, netting twice in a 5–0 win over Huddersfield Town to take his tally to 69.

On 1 June, after missing the semi-final due to injury, Salah scored Liverpool's first goal in a 2–0 win over Tottenham in the 2019 UEFA Champions League Final from a penalty. Salah's goal, which he scored in the opening two minutes of the match, was the second fastest goal ever scored in a Champions League final, slower only than Paolo Maldini's effort for A.C. Milan against Liverpool in the 2005 final. In September 2019, Salah was nominated for the FIFA FIFPro World11 award by worldwide players’ union, FIFPro, and FIFA as one amongst 55 players.

2019–20: Premier League champion 

On 9 August 2019, Salah scored Liverpool's second goal in a 4–1 win against Norwich City in the opening game of the 2019–20 Premier League season. In the 2019 UEFA Super Cup on 14 August, Salah scored Liverpool's fifth and ultimately decisive penalty in a 5–4 penalty shoot-out win against Chelsea, after the game had finished 2–2 after extra-time. In December, Salah ended fifth in the voting polls for the 2019 Ballon d'Or, and made his 100th Premier League appearance later in the month, marking the occasion with a goal and assist in Liverpool's 3–0 win over Bournemouth. Later that month, Liverpool won the 2019 FIFA Club World Cup, with Salah receiving the Golden Ball award for Player of the Tournament.

On 19 January 2020, Salah scored his first goal in five encounters against rivals Manchester United with a run that spanned from outside his box to the other goal in Liverpool's 2–0 win at Anfield in the Premier League. On 29 January, Salah scored Liverpool's opening goal in a 2–0 win at West Ham, a victory that saw the club beat every team in a Premier League season – the first time in the club's 127-year history that they had accomplished it in the top-flight. On 7 March, Salah scored the opening goal in a 2–1 win against Bournemouth as Liverpool made it an English top-flight record of 22 consecutive home wins. It was also his 70th Premier League goal in 100 appearances for Liverpool, meaning that he had scored seven more goals than the previous best in their first 100 league games for the club (63 goals by Fernando Torres). Salah's 20th of the season saw him become the first Liverpool player to score 20 goals in all competitions in three consecutive seasons since Michael Owen between 2000–01 and 2002–03.

On 24 June 2020, he scored as Liverpool beat Crystal Palace 4–0 at Anfield, as Liverpool edged closer to securing the title. After Liverpool being confirmed as champions, Salah would go on to score a further two goals (both against Brighton) before lifting the Premier League trophy after a 5–3 victory over Chelsea.

2020–21: 100th Liverpool goal and more records 
On 12 September 2020, Salah scored a hat-trick in the first league match of a season, including two penalties, in a 4–3 win against Leeds United. Hence, he became the first Liverpool player to score in four consecutive league openers from 2017–18 to 2020–21, and the second man in Premier League history, after Teddy Sheringham from 1992–93 to 1995–96. He also became the first player to score a hat-trick for Liverpool in the first league match since John Aldridge achieved this feat against Charlton Athletic in the 1988–89 season.

On 17 October 2020, he scored his 100th goal for Liverpool in all competitions in a 2–2 away draw against Everton. In scoring his 100th goal in his 159th game, Salah became the first player since Steven Gerrard in 2008 to reach the milestone, and the third fastest in Liverpool's history after Roger Hunt (100 goals in 144 games), and Jack Parkinson (153 games). Salah is the fastest to reach 100 goals for Liverpool while scoring purely in England's top flight, given that both Hunt and Parkinson scored some of their goals for Liverpool in the Football League Second Division.

On 31 January 2021, Salah scored two goals against West Ham and became the fifth Liverpool player to score more than 20 goals in all competitions in four consecutive seasons, and the first since Ian Rush did so six times running from 1981–82 to 1986–87. In addition, his goal in the 68th minute that game was later voted as Premier League Goal of the Month. On 24 April, he scored in a 1–1 draw with Newcastle United, to become the first Liverpool player to score 20 goals in three different Premier League campaigns. On 13 May, he scored a goal in a 4–2 away win over Manchester United, to be his team's first away win at Old Trafford since March 2014. Moreover, he also became the only player to score at Old Trafford for Liverpool in two different games in a season, having scored twice in a 3–2 defeat in the FA Cup, since Harry Chambers in the 1920–21 season.

2021–22: Third Golden Boot and Playmaker of the Season 

Salah opened the 2021–22 season with a goal and two assists in a 3–0 win at Norwich. In scoring Salah became the first player to score in the opening game of five consecutive Premier League seasons. On 12 September, Salah scored his 100th Premier League goal in the 3–0 win away to Leeds United. On 25 September, Salah scored his 100th Premier League goal for Liverpool in a 3–3 draw away to Brentford. Reaching 100 top-flight goals in fewer games than any player in Liverpool history, he achieved the milestone in 151 games, one game fewer than Roger Hunt who reached a century of goals in 152 games. The goal also moved Salah into Liverpool's top 10 all-time scorers list.

On 19 October, Salah became the first player in Liverpool history to score in nine consecutive games with two goals in a 3–2 win away to Atlético Madrid in the UEFA Champions League. His second goal, his 31st in the Champions League, saw him become Liverpool's record goalscorer in the competition, surpassing the 30 goals scored by Steven Gerrard. In his next game on 24 October Salah continued breaking records with a hat-trick against Liverpool's arch rivals Manchester United in a 5–0 victory at Old Trafford. In scoring three goals Salah became the highest scoring African player in Premier League history (surpassing the 104 goals scored by Didier Drogba), and the first Liverpool player to score in ten consecutive games as well as the first Liverpool player to score at Old Trafford three games in a row. He also became the first opposition player to score a hat-trick at Old Trafford since Ronaldo in 2003, and the first to do so in Premier League history. On 1 December, Salah scored twice in a 4–1 away win against Everton in the Premier League as Liverpool became the first team in English top-flight history to score at least two goals in 18 successive games in all competitions.

On 7 December, Salah scored Liverpool's opening goal in a 2–1 away win against A.C. Milan at the San Siro as Liverpool became the first English club to win all six Champions League group games in the competition's history. The goal was Salah's 20th of the season and he became the first Liverpool player since Ian Rush to score 20 goals in five successive seasons. On 16 December, Salah scored Liverpool's second goal in a 3–1 home win against Newcastle United, the 15th consecutive Premier League game he either scored or made an assist, in what was Liverpool's 2000th top-flight win.

On 19 February 2022, Salah became the 10th player to score 150 goals in all competitions for the club, and the second fastest (232 matches) after Roger Hunt (226), when he scored the second goal in a 3–1 Premier League win over Norwich at Anfield.

On 19 April 2022, Salah became the first Premier League Player to score 5 goals against Manchester United in a single season after scoring a brace in a 4–0 win at Anfield. On 29 April 2022, Salah was named England's Men's Footballer of the Year for the second time since 2018.

On 22 May 2022, Salah was awarded his third Golden Boot award at the end of the Premier League 2021–22 season, sharing the award with Son Heung-min after both players scored 23 goals. Salah also won the Playmaker of the Season award after collecting 13 assists.

2022–23: Contract extension and European records 

On 1 July 2022, Salah signed a new contract with Liverpool for another 3 years at the club becoming Liverpool's highest paid player with £350k a week lasting until at least 2025. On 30 July 2022, Salah scored a penalty and assisted a goal in a 3–1 FA Community Shield victory against Manchester City.

On 6 August 2022, Salah began the new Premier League campaign by scoring one goal and assisting another in a 2–2 draw away at Fulham. With his eighth goal in Premier League opening matches, he became the first player to score on the opening day six seasons in a row, and equaled the record of total goals on opening days set by Wayne Rooney, Frank Lampard, and Alan Shearer.

On 12 October, Salah came off the bench in a UEFA Champions League match away to Rangers, before scoring three goals in the space of six minutes and twelve seconds of an eventual 7–1 win. This saw him break Bafétimbi Gomis's record for the fastest Champions League hat-trick of all time. With 38 goals, he also became the highest goalscorer for an English side, beating out Didier Drogba and Sergio Aguero.

On 7 January 2023, Salah surpassed Kenny Dalglish for sixth place on the club's all-time top scorers’ list, taking his tally for the Reds to 173 from 280 matches, when he scored the second goal in a 2–2 FA Cup draw against Wolverhampton Wanderers at Anfield. On 21 February 2023, Salah became Liverpool's top goalscorer in European competitions after scoring the second goal of the UEFA Champions League match against Real Madrid in the first leg of the Round of 16. Moroever, on 5 March 2023, Salah scored two goals, delivered two assists against Manchester United in an historic 7–0 win and became Liverpool's all-time top scorer in the Premier League with 129 goals, overcoming Robbie Fowler's tally of 128. Salah also became the first Liverpool player to score against Manchester United in five consecutive games.. With his first goal against Manchester United, Salah became the highest scoring Egyptian ever with 303 career goals, surpassing Hossam Hassan who had scored 302 goals for club & country in all competitions between 1985 and 2007.

International career

Youth 
Salah played for both the Egypt U-20 team and the Egypt U-23 team, representing Egypt in both the 2011 FIFA U-20 World Cup and the 2012 Summer Olympics, scoring a penalty against Argentina in the round of sixteen of the former tournament, with Egypt losing the match 1–2.

Salah was selected for the youth squad to play at the 2012 Summer Olympics scoring in all three of the team's group games. In their opening match on 26 July, he scored Egypt's second goal in a 3–2 defeat to Brazil. He scored the equaliser in their 1–1 draw against New Zealand played on 29 July, before scoring Egypt's opening goal in a 3–1 win over Belarus in their final group stage game played on 1 August, securing advancement into the knockout stage of the tournament, where Egypt were eliminated following a 3–0 quarter-final defeat to Japan on 4 August.

Senior 
On 3 September 2011, Salah made his debut for the Egypt national football team in the 2–1 away defeat by Sierra Leone. He scored his first goal for Egypt's first team in the 3–0 win against Niger a month later, on 8 October, in qualifying for the 2012 Africa Cup of Nations.

On 10 June 2012, he scored a goal in the 93rd minute in stoppage time against Guinea to give Egypt an important 3–2 away victory in a 2014 World Cup qualifier. On 9 June 2013, Salah scored a hat-trick in a 4–2 away win against Zimbabwe as Egypt won their fourth consecutive match in the World Cup qualifiers. A week later in the following match, he scored the only goal away to Mozambique, putting Egypt into the final qualifying group. On 10 September, Salah scored his sixth tournament goal in a 4–2 win over Guinea, securing Egypt a 100% record to finish their qualifying group and becoming the joint-top scorer among all African teams in the qualification stages.

On 10 October 2014, Salah scored in a 2–0 win over Botswana, also scoring in the return fixture on five days later, in qualifying for the 2015 Africa Cup of Nations. On 19 November, Salah scored the opening goal in a 2–1 away defeat to Tunisia, as Egypt missed out on qualifying for the Africa Cup of Nations finals for a third consecutive time.

Salah was a member of the Pharaohs' squad for the 2017 Africa Cup of Nations held in Gabon. On 25 January, he scored in Egypt's 1–0 win over Ghana to secure first place in Group D. He went all the way to the final with Egypt, scoring twice and assisting two times in six games, earning him a place in the CAF Team of the Tournament.

Salah was the top scorer for Egypt with five goals during the 2018 FIFA World Cup qualification, including both goals in the decisive 2–1 victory over Congo, one of which was a penalty in the last minute to make the Pharaohs reach their first World Cup finals since 1990. Despite doubts over his fitness following his shoulder injury, Salah was included in Egypt's 29-man provisional squad for the 2018 FIFA World Cup and was included in their final 23-man squad on 4 June. He missed Egypt's opening match against Uruguay on 15 June, which the Pharaohs lost 1–0, conceding in the 89th minute. Salah scored a penalty in Egypt's 3–1 defeat to hosts Russia at the Krestovsky Stadium, Saint Petersburg four days later. In Egypt's final group game on 25 June, Salah scored his second goal of the World Cup with a chip over the goalkeeper in Egypt's 2–1 defeat to Saudi Arabia at Volgograd Arena.

On 8 September, in a 6–0 win over Niger in qualifying for the 2019 Africa Cup of Nations, Salah scored two goals, provided two assists and also missed two penalties. His first penalty, in the first minute of the game, was saved, while the second he converted the loose ball after it was initially saved.

On 16 June 2019, Salah provided two assists after coming on as a substitute in 3–1 win over Guinea in friendly warm-up game for the 2019 Africa Cup of Nations on home soil, wearing the captain's armband for the first time ever in his international career. On 26 June, Salah scored his first goal of the tournament in Egypt's second group match, a 2–0 win over DR Congo; he was also involved in the opening goal of the match, which was scored by captain Ahmed Elmohamady.

Salah was named as the captain of the Egypt national team in September 2019. In 2021–22, Salah had to face his Liverpool teammate Sadio Mané twice, as Egypt competed against Senegal in the 2021 Africa Cup of Nations Final and third round of the 2022 World Cup qualifications; however, Egypt lost both encounters in the penalty shootout.

Style of play

Analysis 

Regarded as a quick, mobile, hard-working and tactical player, with good technique and an eye for goal, Salah is predominantly known for his speed, movement, clinical finishing, agility, dribbling skills, first touch, and ball control, as well as his ability to use both his pace and flair on the ball in order to beat opponents, and create scoring opportunities for himself or his teammates. A versatile forward, he primarily plays as a winger on the right flank, a position which allows him to cut into the centre onto his stronger left foot, and either shoot on goal or play quick exchanges with other players and make runs in behind the defence towards goal. He can also play in the centre behind the main striker as either an attacking midfielder or second striker.

On his increased threat in front of goal since joining Liverpool, Salah credits Liverpool manager Jürgen Klopp’s request for him to occupy more advanced central positions, often operating as a main striker, with the forward telling ESPN, "I play closer to the goal than any club before." Salah initially started his career at the left-back position, however, following a 4–0 win over the youth team of Egyptian club ENPPI, Salah was in tears for not scoring after missing several clear chances; this made his coach realise his passion for scoring goals, forcing him to move him to a forward position.

Reception 
Salah is regarded by several pundits and footballing figures as one of the best players in the world and one of the best African players of all time. While Salah was playing at Al Mokawloon, American coach Bob Bradley saw Salah play and noted his prodigious speed, explosiveness, and intelligence on the pitch, already evident at his young age. Upon signing for Chelsea, José Mourinho said of Salah: "He's young, he's fast, he's creative, he's enthusiastic. When we analysed him he looks the kind of humble personality on the pitch, ready to work for the team." Mourinho added that Salah has "similar qualities" with "talented players" that he had worked with, such as Gareth Bale and Arjen Robben. His technical skills, pace, left foot, goalscoring, position and direct playing style led him to be nicknamed the "Egyptian Messi", in the Italian media. Brazilian World Cup winner Ronaldo – whom Salah idolized while growing up – stated, "Salah is an incredible player with a tremendous quality. He looks like Messi." Salah has also received praise for his refusal to celebrate against his former clubs.

Personal life 

Salah and his wife, Maggi, married in 2013. Their daughter, Makka, born in 2014, is named in honour of the Islamic holy city of Mecca. He had another daughter, Kayan, born in 2020. Salah is Muslim and celebrates goals by performing the sujud. On this goal celebration, Salah told CNN, "It's something like praying or thanking God for what I have received, but yeah, it's just praying and praying for a win. I've always done that since I was young, everywhere."

Salah enjoys playing football on his PlayStation, and has confessed jokingly that "Salah in the video game is stronger than the real one". Salah has also revealed that his favourite food is kushari, an Egyptian working class dish in origin that is usually made from rice, pasta and lentils and topped with a variety of options including spiced tomatoes, chickpeas and onions.

During the 2018 Egyptian presidential election, a large number of spoilt ballot papers, possibly more than a million, involved voters crossing out both names and writing Salah's name instead.

In November 2020, Salah tested positive for COVID-19.

Outside football

Sponsors 
Salah has a sponsorship deal with sportswear and equipment supplier Adidas: he wears Adidas X18 football boots. He appeared in an Adidas 2018 World Cup commercial along with other players in the Adidas stable, including David Beckham, Lionel Messi and Paul Pogba, and singer Pharrell Williams.

In March 2018, Salah appeared in an advertisement for Vodafone Egypt. Filmed visiting several Merseyside landmarks, the video was originally released in Arabic (but was also translated to English). A month later, he mentioned that he was "insulted" after his image was displayed across the national team's plane without his permission before the start of the World Cup that year, as the official sponsor of the national team, WE, is a rival of his sponsor.

Charity 
Salah is active in regeneration projects in Nagrig, his hometown where 65% of people live in poverty, donating money to help build a school and hospital. The project includes the construction of an Al-Azhar institute and an ambulance unit. In an interview with Al-Masry Al-Youm, Salah's father claimed that his son refused to accept any financial assistance with the project.

During his time in Egypt, Salah's family was once robbed, however, the thief was caught and arrested by police, with Salah's father preparing to press charges against him, but Mohamed convinced him to drop the case. Afterwards, Salah helped the thief financially, giving him some money and trying to find him a job. In February 2018, following a match against Tottenham, Salah donated a replica shirt to young supporter Mohamed Abdel Karim, who was previously pictured wearing a jumper reading Salah's name and shirt number. Moreover, Mohamed Salah has helped more than 450 families by giving them monthly allowances and he also helped the government by giving approximately $300,000 when the country was experiencing an economic crisis.

On 13 August 2022, a fire broke out at Abu Sefein Church in Giza, Egypt, with 41 people losing their lives as a result. Salah subsequently expressed his condolences on Twitter, and made a donation of three million Egyptian pounds to help rebuild the church.

In popular culture

The most popular chant for Salah was made by Liverpool supporters where they called him the Egyptian King – “Mo Salah! Mo Salah! Mo Salah! Running down the wing. Mo Salah la-la-la la-ahh, The Egyptian King!”, they also created another chant to the tune of Dodgy's "Good Enough", saying that if Salah continued to score goals, they would convert to Islam – "If he's good enough for you, he's good enough for me, if he scores another few, then I'll be Muslim too." Salah has given his approval to the chant, and it has been cited as an example of inclusivity. According to a 2021 study in the American Political Science Review, Salah's transfer to Liverpool led to a 16% reduction in hate crimes in the city, as well as reducing Islamophobic online rhetoric by Liverpool fans. Salah is devout to a degree that many other well-known Muslims sports figures are not, and his charm and apolitical persona have made him a popular figure in the UK. During his goal celebration, Salah lays in the prostrate position to thank God in sujud.

Salah is nicknamed "The Pharaoh" by the press and his fans. He has also been given the nickname "Egyptian King" by Liverpool supporters, arising from a chant set to the tune of "Sit Down" by English indie rock band James.

Following his goal that led Egypt to the World Cup finals for the first time since 1990, a school in Egypt was named after him. Following Egypt's exit from the World Cup, Salah stayed in his home country for his pre-season holiday. In late June, his address was accidentally leaked on Facebook. After this, crowds of fans showed up at Salah's house, with Salah greeting the fans and signing autographs for some, although according to reports in Spain, police did arrive to cordon off his house.

During Liverpool's 2018 pre-season tour in the U.S., American artist Brandan Odums created a mural in the Times Square area displaying Salah in the Egypt kit, with the player later posting an image on social media posing next to it. In Egypt, several murals have also been created displaying Salah's likeness, including one in the capital of Cairo.

A testament to his influence in the region and globally, Salah was featured on the cover of two major magazines in 2018: GQ Middle East (feature story titled "The Unstoppable Rise of Mo Salah") and Time magazine's 2019 TIME 100 edition. An advocate of women's equality in the Middle East, Salah  (in his TIME 100 entry) states, "We need to change the way we treat women in our culture". English comedian, and noted Liverpool fan, John Oliver wrote Salah's feature in the TIME 100 issue. Oliver notably started the feature writing "Mo Salah is a better human being than he is a football player. And he’s one of the best football players in the world." Despite being named as the "GQ Middle East Man of The Year" in 2019, another GQ photoshoot, with Brazilian model Alessandra Ambrosio, caused him some criticism in the Islamic world. In January 2020, Salah was honoured with a wax statue at Madame Tussauds in London. The museum announced that the statue would be unveiled later in the year. “As Egyptian forward and currently both European and World Club champion with Liverpool F.C., Mo Salah is a global star at the peak of his power. We know that fans will love seeing him at the home of celebrity, where he rightly belongs,” Steve Davies, General Manager at Madame Tussauds in London said.

Career statistics

Club

International 

Egypt score listed first, score column indicates score after each Salah goal

Honours 

Basel
Swiss Super League: 2012–13, 2013–14

Liverpool
Premier League: 2019–20
FA Cup: 2021–22
EFL Cup: 2021–22
FA Community Shield: 2022;
UEFA Champions League: 2018–19; runner-up: 2017–18, 2021–22
UEFA Super Cup: 2019
FIFA Club World Cup: 2019

Egypt
Africa Cup of Nations runner-up: 2017, 2021

Individual
CAF Most Promising Talent of the Year: 2012
UAFA Golden Boy: 2012
Swiss Super League Player of the Year: 2013
El Heddaf Arab Footballer of the Year: 2013, 2017, 2018
A.S. Roma Player of the Season: 2015–16
Globe Soccer Best Arab Player of the Year: 2016
CAF Team of the Year: 2017, 2018, 2019
Africa Cup of Nations Team of the Tournament: 2017, 2021
Premier League Player of the Month: November 2017, February 2018, March 2018, October 2021
Premier League Goal of the Month: January 2021, October 2021
PFA Player of the Month (10) : November 2017, December 2017, February 2018, March 2018, December 2018, January 2019, April 2019, September 2021, October 2021, February 2022
BBC African Footballer of the Year: 2017, 2018
African Footballer of the Year: 2017, 2018
PFA Players' Player of the Year: 2017–18, 2021–22
FWA Footballer of the Year: 2017–18, 2021–22
Premier League Golden Boot: 2017–18, 2018–19 (shared), 2021–22 (shared)
Premier League Player of the Season: 2017–18
Premier League Playmaker of the Season: 2021–22
Premier League Goal of the Season: 2021–22
PFA Premier League Team of the Year: 2017–18, 2020–21, 2021–22
Liverpool Players' Player of the Season Award: 2017–18, 2020–21, 2021–22
PFA Fans' Player of the Year: 2017–18, 2020–21, 2021–22
UEFA Champions League Squad of the Season: 2017–18
ESM Team of the Year: 2017–18, 2021–22
Onze d'Argent: 2017–18
Honorary Citizen of the Chechen Republic: 2018
FIFA Puskás Award: 2018
FIFA Club World Cup Golden Ball: 2019
FSA Player of the Year: 2018, 2021
Time 100: 2019
Liverpool Goal of the Season: 2018–19 (vs. Chelsea), 2021–22 (vs. Man City)
GQ Middle East Man of The Year Award: 2019
IFFHS CAF Men's Team of The Year: 2020, 2021, 2022
IFFHS Best CAF Men's Player of the Decade: 2011–2020
IFFHS CAF Men's Team of the Decade: 2011–2020
Laureus Sporting Inspiration Award: 2021
Golden Foot: 2021
IFFHS Best CAF Men's Player of the Year: 2021
BBC Goal of the Season: 2021–22
Globe Soccer Fans' Player of the Year: 2022
Goal 25: 2017, 2018, 2019, 2020, 2021
Top 100 most influential Africans by New African magazine: 2018.

Records 
Europe
Fastest hat-trick in a UEFA Champions League match: 6 minutes and 12 seconds against Rangers, 12 October 2022
Most Champions League goals for an English club: 41 goals for Liverpool
Quickest UEFA Champions League hat-trick by a substitute: 13 minutes against Rangers, 12 October 2022
Most goals scored in UEFA club competitions by an African player: 53 goals
Fewest touches ever to score hat-trick in a UEFA Champions League match: 9 touches
All-time African top goalscorer in the UEFA Champions League history: 44 goals

England
Most goals in a 38-game Premier League season: 32 goals in 2017–18
Most games scored in during a Premier League season: 24 games in 2017–18
Most goals by an African player in a Premier League season: 32 goals in 2017–18
Most Premier League Player of the Month awards in a single season: 3 (November 2017, February 2018 and March 2018)
Most left-footed goals scored in a season: 25 goals in 2017–18
Most teams scored against in a Premier League season: 17 teams (shared with Ian Wright and Robin van Persie)
First player to outscore three Premier League teams in a Premier League season: West Brom (31), Swansea City (28) and Huddersfield Town (28) in 2017–18
First player to score on the opening day of six consecutive Premier League seasons: (2017–18 to 2022–23)
Highest-scoring African player in Premier League history: 131 goals
Most Premier League goals scored on the opening weekend: 8 goals (shared with Alan Shearer and Frank Lampard and Wayne Rooney)

Liverpool
Most goals in a debut season: 44 goals in 2017–18
Most European goals in a season: 11 goals in 2017–18 (shared with Roberto Firmino)
Most games scored in during a single campaign: 34 games in 2017–18
Most top-flight goals in a season by a Liverpool player: 32 goals in Premier League 2017–18 (shared with Ian Rush)
Most Liverpool Player of the Month awards in a season: 7 months in 2017–18
Fastest player to score 50 goals for Liverpool: 65 games in 2018–19
Fastest Liverpool player to score 50 Premier League goals: 69 games in 2018–19
Most goals in the first 100 appearances overall in Liverpool history: 69 goals
Most goals in first 100 Premier League appearances in Liverpool history: 70 goals
All-time Liverpool top goalscorer in the UEFA Champions League: 41 goals
First Liverpool player to score 20+ goals in four different Premier League seasons: 2017–18, 2018–19, 2020–21, 2021–22
Fastest player to score 100 top-flight goals in Liverpool history: 151 games
Most consecutive games a player has scored for Liverpool: 10 games in 2021–22
All-time Liverpool top goalscorer in European competitions history: 42 goals 
All-time Liverpool top goalscorer in the Premier League: 129 goals

Egypt
Egypt's all-time highest scorer in FIFA World Cup history: 2 goals in 2018 (shared with Abdulrahman Fawzi, 2 goals in 1934)
Egypt's all-time highest scorer in CAF Africa Cup of Nations qualification: 18 goals

Italy
Highest-scoring Egyptian in Serie A history: 35 goals in 81 games

See also 

Premier League records and statistics
List of Liverpool F.C. records and statistics
List of Egyptian football players in foreign leagues

References

External links 

Profile at the Liverpool F.C. website

1992 births
Living people
People from Gharbia Governorate
Egyptian footballers
Association football forwards
Al Mokawloon Al Arab SC players
FC Basel players
Chelsea F.C. players
ACF Fiorentina players
A.S. Roma players
Liverpool F.C. players
Egyptian Premier League players
Swiss Super League players
Premier League players
Serie A players
FA Cup Final players
UEFA Champions League winning players
African Footballer of the Year winners
First Division/Premier League top scorers
Egypt youth international footballers
Egypt international footballers
2017 Africa Cup of Nations players
2018 FIFA World Cup players
2019 Africa Cup of Nations players
2021 Africa Cup of Nations players
Olympic footballers of Egypt
Footballers at the 2012 Summer Olympics
Egyptian expatriate footballers
Expatriate footballers in Switzerland
Expatriate footballers in England
Expatriate footballers in Italy
Egyptian expatriate sportspeople in Switzerland
Egyptian expatriate sportspeople in England
Egyptian expatriate sportspeople in Italy
Egyptian Muslims